Joyce J. Peppin (born July 2, 1970) is an American politician and former majority leader of the Minnesota House of Representatives. A member of the Republican Party of Minnesota, she represented District 34A, which included portions of Hennepin County in the northwestern Twin Cities metropolitan area.

Early life, education, and career
Raised on a farm near Randall, Peppin graduated from Little Falls High School in Little Falls, then attended the University of Minnesota in Duluth, receiving her B.A. in political science and speech communications in 1992. In 2007, she earned her M.B.A. at the University of St. Thomas in Saint Paul. She was a communications consultant for the Minnesota House from 1992 to 1997, worked as a communications manager and vice president of public relations for U.S. Bancorp from 1997 to 2001, and was a communications specialist for the Minnesota House Republican Caucus until running for the House herself in 2004.

Peppin has also been active in her local community, serving on the Hassan Township Parks Commission from 1998 to 2004, as a member of the I-94 West Chamber of Commerce, and as chair of the Mary Queen of Peace Catholic School Advisory Board from 2002 to 2004.

Minnesota House of Representatives
Peppin was first elected in 2004; and she was reelected in 2006, 2008, 2010, 2012, 2014, and 2016. In 2015, she became Majority Leader of the Minnesota House of Representatives. She resigned effective July 2, 2018, to join the Minnesota Rural Electric Association as director of government affairs and general counsel.

Elections

References

External links

 Project Votesmart - Rep. Joyce Peppin Profile
 Minnesota Public Radio Votetracker: Rep. Joyce Peppin
 Joyce Peppin Campaign Web Site

|-

1970 births
21st-century American politicians
21st-century American women politicians
Living people
Republican Party members of the Minnesota House of Representatives
People from Morrison County, Minnesota
People from Rogers, Minnesota
University of Minnesota Duluth alumni
University of St. Thomas (Minnesota) alumni
Women state legislators in Minnesota